"Loverboy" is a song by American singer and songwriter Mariah Carey. It was released on June 19, 2001, by Virgin Records America as the lead single from her eighth studio album Glitter, the soundtrack to the 2001 film of the same name. Written and produced by Carey, Larry Blackmon, Thomas Jenkins and Clark Kent, "Loverboy" is built around a sample from "Candy" by the funk band Cameo, who are also featured on the track. Lyrically, the song finds Carey fantasizing about her loverboy, a man that will fulfill her physical and sexual desires. The recording was accompanied by an official remix, titled "Loverboy Remix", featuring guest artists Ludacris, Da Brat, Shawnna and Twenty II.

The track was subject to controversy, following reports that Jennifer Lopez and Tommy Mottola (Carey's ex-husband) stole the idea of sampling the singer's original planned sample, Yellow Magic Orchestra's "Firecracker", over a month after Carey had signed for it. Since Carey's Glitter was to be released over a month after Lopez's album, she changed the song's melody to sample from "Candy" instead. Further controversy ensued following its release, as Carey was hospitalized for severe mental and physical exhaustion, following poorly received television appearances involving both the song and album.

After the song's release in the United States, "Loverboy" stalled on the Billboard Hot 100 at number two due to weak radio airplay. The single jumped 58 spots on the Billboard Hot 100 the week ending August 4, 2001, with sales driven by a Virgin promotion offering the CD for a bargain-priced 49 cents. "Loverboy" only spent 14 weeks on the chart. It also became Carey's first lead single to not reach number one. Though it peaked at number one in Croatia and reached the top 10 in Australia and Canada, the song failed to garner strong charting elsewhere, reaching the top 20 in Portugal, Italy and the United Kingdom.

"Loverboy" received generally mixed reviews from music critics; many called the song unoriginal and dated while others felt that the featured artists (primarily on the remix version) overpowered Carey and made the song disorganized. A music video, directed by David LaChapelle, was shot for both versions of the song. The first version features Carey as a scantily-clad car girl, waving a flag as her loverboy finishes a race. The video for the remix version features similar footage, only including shots of the song's guests in race-cars during their verses. She performed "Loverboy" live on The Sweet Sweet Fantasy Tour in 2016, as well as her Caution World Tour in 2019.

In 2020, the original "Firecracker"-sampled version of "Loverboy" was included on Carey's eighth compilation album The Rarities and was released as a limited edition double a-side Japanese single in December 2020.

Background and release 
Originally planned to be released at a later date, "Loverboy" was leaked to radio on June 1, 2001. As a result, Virgin Records pushed the release date in order to control the leak. Following the release of "Loverboy", Carey embarked on a short promotional campaign for the song. On July 18, 2001, Virgin scheduled Carey to do a day of interviews with radio stations. After she called in an hour late to Q100 in Atlanta at 9:00 a.m. and the hosts informed Carey that she was late, the rest of the day's interviews were canceled. The next day, Carey made a surprise appearance on the MTV program Total Request Live (TRL). As the show's host Carson Daly began taping following a commercial break, Carey came out onto the filming stage, pushing an ice cream cart while wearing a large men's shirt. Seemingly anxious and exhilarated, Carey began giving out individual bars of ice cream to fans and guests on the program, while waving to the crowd down below on Times Square, while diverging into a rambling monologue regarding therapy. Carey then walked to Daly's platform and began a striptease, in which she shed her shirt to reveal a tight yellow and green ensemble, leading him to exclaim "Mariah Carey has lost her mind!". While she later revealed that Daly was aware of her presence in the building prior to her appearance, she admitted that he was meant to act surprised in order to provide a more dramatic effect for the program.

Carey's appearance on TRL garnered strong media attention, with many critics and newspapers citing her behavior as "troubled" and "erratic". In the days following her appearance on TRL, Carey had begun displaying "erratic behavior" during a public record signing for the single at Tower Records in New York. As the appearance was filmed, she began rambling on several points, leading her to discuss radio-host Howard Stern and how his form of humor on his program bothered her greatly. At that point, Carey's publicist Cindi Berger grabbed the microphone from her hand and ordered the cameras to stop filming. A few days later, Carey began posting irregular voice notes and messages on her official website:
I'm trying to understand things in life right now and so I really don't feel that I should be doing music right now. What I'd like to do is just a take a little break or at least get one night of sleep without someone popping up about a video. All I really want is [to] just be me and that's what I should have done in the first place ... I don't say this much but guess what, I don't take care of myself.
After the removal of the messages, Berger commented that Carey had been "obviously exhausted and not thinking clearly" when she posted the letters. Two days later on July 26, she was suddenly hospitalized, citing "extreme exhaustion" and a "physical and emotional breakdown". Following the heavy media coverage surrounding Carey's publicized breakdown and hospitalization, Virgin Records and 20th Century Fox delayed the release of both the film's soundtrack and the film itself for three weeks: from August 21 to September 11 and from August 31 to September 21, respectively.

Following Carey's absence from the public eye, as well as her abandonment of promotional appearances for the film and soundtrack, her unprecedented $100 million five-album record deal with Virgin Records (EMI Records) was bought out for $50 million. The decision was brought out due to the low sales of the project, as well as the negative publicity surrounding her breakdown. Soon after, Carey flew to Capri, Italy for a period of five months, in which she began writing material for her new album, stemming from all the personal experiences she had endured throughout the past year. Additionally, she founded her own label modelled after her initials, MonarC Entertainment and signed a new three-album record deal with Island Records, valued at over $23 million.

In 2020, the original and previously unreleased version of "Loverboy" that sampled "Firecracker" was included on Carey's compilation album The Rarities as part of the "#MC30" initiative. The latter was a campaign marking the 30th anniversary of Carey's self-titled debut studio album, Mariah Carey (1990), and coincides with her memoir The Meaning of Mariah Carey (2020). "Loverboy" (Firecracker – Original Version) was released as a limited edition double a-side single with "Here We Go Around Again", another song taken from The Rarities.

Composition 

"Loverboy"'s hook is built around a sample of "Candy", by Cameo. Aside from borrowing from the melody, "Loverboy" features the members of Cameo, including group leader Larry Blackmon, as vocalists on the track. According to Chuck Taylor from Billboard, "Loverboy" is reminiscent of several of Carey's previous lead singles, as they too were predominantly built around samples of older songs. He described some of its background flourishes as "swirling harmonies overtop" and noted the inclusion of many shouts and ad-libs from Carey and Cameo.

Due to the song's heavy usage of the "Candy" sample and the heavy blend of instrumentation and vocals, he said that to his bewilderment, the song was "devoid of a standard hook". NMEs Elios Therepio felt the idea of sampling "Candy" was genius "on paper", but once it was recorded, it suffered from various miscalculations. He felt it did not match the success Carey's previous single, "Fantasy" (which also recalled its melody from an older song), and criticized the inclusion of several over-the-top "keyboard and synth arrangements". Regarding Carey's voice, aside from describing it as "obscured", Therepio expressed his difficulty in understanding her lyrical phrases, claiming it was weakened from "no-everyone-can-understand-what-you're-saying'-itis". Gil Kaufman from MTV News noted the inclusion of "bouncing funky bass [and] rock guitars", while Roger Caitlin of the Hartford Courant described how Carey was often reduced to "breathy background vocals" on "Loverboy".

Lyrically, the song finds Carey looking for her "loverboy" and a sugar-daddy who is going to "love her right". Therepio found it ironic how Carey was crooning for a sugar-daddy, when she had just left one (referring to her older ex-husband Tommy Mottola). Additionally, he felt Carey was molding her image from that of a balladeer, to a "pin-up image" of a pop star. The song's lyrics are racy and feature the protagonist asking for her "loverboy" to fulfill her sexual desires: "Loverboy come on and love me / Give me more".

Sampling controversy 

Throughout 2000, Carey had already been writing and recording material for Glitter. During this period, she developed the concept for the album's lead single, "Loverboy". Originally, Carey had sampled the melody and hook from the 1978 Yellow Magic Orchestra song "Firecracker", using an interpolation of it throughout the chorus and introduction. In early theatrical trailers for Glitter, the original version of "Loverboy" was still featured. As Carey had ended her contract with Columbia Records, Jennifer Lopez was signed by Tommy Mottola and had begun recording material for her album, J.Lo (2001).According to The Inc.'s Irv Gotti, Mottola, head of Columbia and Carey's ex-husband, knew of Carey's usage of the "Firecracker" sample and attempted to have Lopez use the same sample before her. At the time, Carey had become increasingly paranoid over outside executives being informed about Glitter, especially following news of Mottola's "theft" of the song.

When the music publishers for "Firecracker" were questioned, they admitted Carey had licensed usage of the sample first, and Lopez's team had signed for it over one month later, under Mottola's arrangement. Following the scandal, Carey was not able to use the original sample, as Lopez's album was to be released far earlier than Glitter. She subsequently changed the composition of "Loverboy" and incorporated a new sample, "Candy" by Cameo.

The "Firecracker" sample was used by Lopez on her song "I'm Real", from her album J.Lo. The original version of "Loverboy" with the "Firecracker" sample was later included on Carey's 2020 compilation album The Rarities.

Critical reception 

"Loverboy" was met with generally mixed reviews from music critics; many were not impressed with the incorporation of the sample and felt the song did not lead Carey into any newer ground or innovation. Additionally, several reviewers were not impressed with Carey's concealed vocals and the song's complex production. Sarah Rodman of the Boston Herald described the song's production as a "traffic-jam" and wrote "'Loverboy' is another in an increasingly long line of glitzy, candy-coated, creatively stunted song." Writing for the Los Angeles Times, Natalie Nichols felt "Loverboy" was "predictable" and presented nothing new for Carey's audience. USA Todays Edna Gunderson wrote the song off as "skimpy", while Glenn Gamboa from Newsday described its overall reception as "lukewarm".

Harry Guerin from Raidió Teilifís Éireann outed the song as one of Carey's "finest moments" on Glitter and disagreed with criticism regarding the "overly-populated" musical background". Allmusic editor Stephen Thomas Erlewine listed the song as the only "recommended" song from Glitter, while Gil Kaufman of MTV News called it a "fun, uptempo dance number". Craig Seymour from Entertainment Weekly rated "Loverboy" a C−, criticizing its lyrical content and production. An anonymous writer from The Guardian felt the song had "no decipherable tune", due to the inclusion of electronic musical instruments and background shouts and ad-libs. Billboards Chuck Taylor described the song as "self-sabotage" and felt Carey was gambling her longevity. He described the production as a "mumbo jumbo of disparate elements" and wrote "the mighty may have fallen here".

Chart performance 

Prior to Virgin's release of "Loverboy", Carey halted all promotional appearances corresponding to the song. Citing an emotional breakdown and a subsequent hospitalization, Carey remained out of the public eye for several weeks. After its release, "Loverboy" failed to garner strong charting on prominent international markets and received poor radio airplay throughout the United States. "Loverboy" peaked atop the Billboards Hot Singles Sales chart for four consecutive weeks, though due to weak airplay, managed to reach number two on the Billboard Hot 100 with "Bootylicious" by Destiny's Child holding it back from the top position. "Loverboy" finished as the best-selling single of 2001 in the United States, with sales of 571,000 units, falling short of the previous year's best-seller, which accumulated sales upwards of one million copies. The Recording Industry Association of America (RIAA) certified the song Gold. In Canada, "Loverboy" peaked at number three on the singles chart and charted for a total of thirteen weeks.

Throughout Australasia and Europe, the song peaked outside the top 20 in most countries. "Loverboy" debuted at its peak position of number seven on the Australian Singles Chart, during the week of July 29, 2001. The following week, the song began its decline and experienced a total chart trajectory of seven weeks. The song was certified Gold by the Australian Recording Industry Association (ARIA), denoting shipments of over 35,000 units. On July 29, 2001, "Loverboy" debuted at number 65 on the Ö3 Austria Top 40 chart, spending a total of three weeks in the chart. The song achieved relatively weak charting in both the Flemish and Wallonian territories in Belgium, peaking at numbers 49 and 34, respectively. Making its debut at its peak position of number 54, "Loverboy" charted for a total of nine weeks in France, before falling out on November 3, 2001. On the Dutch Top 40 chart, the song made its debut at number 68. The following week the song peaked at number 34, before dropping outside the top 40 three weeks later, ending its five-week run. On July 26, 2001, "Loverboy" debuted at number 49 on the Swedish Singles Chart and reached a peak of number 44. Similarly in Switzerland, the song peaked at number 66 and spent only four weeks fluctuating inside the chart. On the UK Singles Chart, the song debuted at its peak of number 12. The following week, the song dropped to number 29 on the chart, before dropping outside the top 40 two weeks later.

Remix 
Aside from the regular version of the song, an official remix of "Loverboy" was included on Glitter. The song's main remix, titled "Loverboy Remix", uses the same sample as the album version and retains all of Carey's original vocals. It has a different introduction, the singing and spoken parts of Cameo are greatly reduced (and are not credited), and additional raps are included by Da Brat, Ludacris, Shawnna, and Twenty II. NME writer Elios Therepio rated the remix five out of ten stars and claimed the song to have been a much weaker lead single than Carey's "Fantasy" (1995). Jim Farber from Daily News criticized Brat's verse, writing how it "cut right through" the production. The Morning Calls Len Righi described the remix as "cloddish", while Jim Abbott from the Orlando Sentinel felt the song's guests "upstaged" Carey.

Promotion

Music video 

Two music videos, both directed by David LaChapelle, were shot for the song and its accompanying remix and premiered on Total Request Live on June 8, 2001. The videos introduced a less demure image of Carey, one that received negative backlash from critics. She appears in the video with a lighter hair color than she had sported in the past and wearing a series of revealing ensembles. Reviewers disregarded Carey's newer image, primarily her double-handkerchief bra, and likened her to younger pop singers such as Britney Spears, which they felt cheapened the singer. The video begins with Cameo frontman Larry Blackmon driving all over a racetrack, while Carey, dressed in revealing clothing, is shown singing in various "car girl" positions at the track on a hot summer day. She flags down cars as the "flag girl" and dances as a "tire girl" in a kaleidoscope-inspired sequence, before jumping out of a pop out cake to the roars of the crowd below.

Several other scenes of Carey in a pink jumpsuit while riding on top of a race-car are shown, during which Blackmon continues the race. A video was also made for the remix and retains most of the shots of the original. In it, Ludacris and Shawnna can be seen rapping together as they ride in an old car, while Da Brat and Twenty II rap together in a more modern car without a hood.

The music video for "Loverboy" received generally negative reviews from critics, many of whom felt Carey was portrayed in an overtly sexual manner. A writer from The Guardian criticized the video, calling it "wacky" and describing Carey's choreography as "running amok". Slant Magazine's Sal Cinquemani felt the video was "brilliantly over-the-top", while an anonymous columnist from NME commented that it would cause male viewers to "play with themselves" after watching. In a countdown of "The 5 Least Sexiest Music Videos", Priya Elan from NME included the video at number three, writing how the singer "spins with the mad-eyed grace of someone who hasn't been to sleep for 72 hours" (referring to Carey's mention of insomnia as a reason for her breakdown). Japiya Burns of The Michigan Daily was critical of Carey's portrayal in the video, primarily her double-handkerchief bra. He felt that in doing so, Carey was cheapening herself and her image to resemble younger pop singers such as Britney Spears.

Live performances 
At the time of its release, Carey did not perform "Loverboy" live. The first performance of the song came 5 months later at a private special concert for the US troops at Camp Bondsteele in Kosovo. Carey also performed her single at the time "Never Too Far / Hero Medley", "My All", a snippet of "Santa Claus Is Comin' to Town" and "All I Want for Christmas Is You". 15 years later, it was performed again on Carey's Sweet Sweet Fantasy Tour in 2016, this time as part of the Car Ride medley. Three years later, it was also performed as part of the #JusticeForGlitter medley of Carey's Caution World Tour.

Formats and track listings 

Australian CD single
 "Loverboy" (featuring Cameo)
 "Loverboy" (Remix featuring Da Brat and Ludacris)
 "Loverboy" (Club of Love Remix)
 "Loverboy" (MJ Cole Remix)
 "Loverboy" (Dub of Love Remix)

Australian promo CD single
 "Loverboy" (featuring Cameo)
 "Loverboy" (David Morales Club of Love Mix)
 "Loverboy" (Remix featuring Da Brat and Ludacris)
 "Loverboy" (MJ Cole Main Mix Radio Edit)
 "Loverboy" (David Morales Drums Of Love Mix)

Japanese CD single
 "Loverboy" (featuring Cameo)
 "Loverboy" (Remix featuring Da Brat and Ludacris)

European CD maxi-single
 "Loverboy" (MJ Cole Remix)
 "Loverboy" (MJ Cole Radio Edit)
 "Loverboy" (MJ Cole London Dub Mix)
 "Loverboy" (MJ Cole Instrumental)
 "Loverboy" (Club of Love Remix)
 "Loverboy" (Club of Love Radio Edit)
 "Loverboy" (Dreamy Club of Love Radio Edit)
 "Loverboy" (Dub of Love Remix)
 "Loverboy" (Drums of Love)

European CD single
 "Loverboy" (featuring Cameo)
 "Loverboy" (Remix featuring Da Brat and Ludacris)

UK 12-inch vinyl single
 "Loverboy" (Drums of Love)
 "Loverboy" (Dub of Love Remix)
 "Loverboy" (MJ Cole London Dub Mix)

UK promo maxi-single
 "Loverboy" (featuring Cameo)
 "Loverboy" (MJ Cole Remix)
 "Loverboy" (Club of Love Remix)

US CD maxi-single
 "Loverboy" (featuring Cameo)
 "Loverboy" (Remix featuring Da Brat and Ludacris)
 "Loverboy" (MJ Cole Remix)
 "Loverboy" (MJ Cole Instrumental)
 "Loverboy" (MJ Cole London Dub Mix)
 "Loverboy" (Club of Love Remix)
 "Loverboy" (Dub of Love Remix)
 "Loverboy" (Drums of Love)

Japanese Limited Edition 2020 Cassette Single
 "Here We Go Around Again"
 "Loverboy" (Firecracker – Original Version)

Credits and personnel 
Credits for Glitter adapted from the album's liner notes.

Mariah Carey – songwriting, producer, vocals, background vocals
Da Brat – songwriting, vocals (remix only)
Larry Blackmon – songwriting
Tomi Jenkins – songwriting
Clark Kent – producer
Carl "Butch" Small – percussion
Peter Novak – engineer
Ludacris – songwriting, vocals (remix only)
Andrew Felluss – engineer
Ann Mincieli – engineer
Anthony Kilhoffer – engineer
Elliot Blakely – engineer
Dana Jon Chappelle – mixing
Michael "Mikizza" Schlesinger – mixing
Evren Göknar – Mastering Engineer
Cameo – vocals
Mary Ann Tatum – background vocals
Shawnna – songwriting, vocals (remix only)
Twenty II – songwriting, vocals (remix only)

Charts

Certifications and sales

Release history

See also 
 List of number-one R&B singles of 2001 (U.S.)
 List of best-selling singles in the United States

References 

2001 singles
2001 songs
Mariah Carey songs
Cameo (band) songs
Ludacris songs
Music videos directed by David LaChapelle
Sampling controversies
Songs written for films
Songs written by Larry Blackmon
Songs written by Mariah Carey
Virgin Records singles